Nevelsky District is an administrative district (raion) of Sakhalin Oblast, Russia; one of the seventeen in the oblast. Municipally, it is incorporated as Nevelsky Urban Okrug. It is located in the southwest of the oblast and includes Moneron Island to the west, located in the south of the Tartary Strait. Its administrative center is the town of Nevelsk. Population (excluding the administrative center):

References

Notes

Sources

Districts of Sakhalin Oblast